Berdymyrat Nurmyradow (born 28 August 1968 in USSR) is a Turkmenistan professional football player and manager.

Career
In 1985, he began his professional career for the Kolhozçi Aşgabat. In 2000, he played for the Nisa Aşgabat. In 2002, he returned to Köpetdag Aşgabat. Footballer finished his career in the Garagum Türkmenabat.

In 1992, he made his debut for the Turkmenistan national football team.

In 2003, he started his coaching career in Köpetdag Aşgabat and after managed until the club dissolved in 2007. In 2008, together with Alikper Gurbani, headed the FC Altyn Asyr.

References

External links
 

1968 births
Living people
Soviet footballers
Turkmenistan international footballers
Association football forwards
FK Köpetdag Aşgabat players
FC Nisa Aşgabat players
Turkmenistan football managers
FK Köpetdag Aşgabat managers
Turkmenistan footballers
Footballers at the 1994 Asian Games
Asian Games competitors for Turkmenistan